The 2017 Charlottetown-Parkdale provincial by-election took place on November 27, 2017. The by-election was triggered by the resignation of the district's incumbent MLA Doug Currie on October 19.

Green Party candidate Hannah Bell won the election, becoming the second member of the party to be elected to the Legislative Assembly after Peter Bevan-Baker successfully contested the district of Kellys Cross-Cumberland in the 2015 general election.

Background

District profile 
Charlottetown-Parkdale was established ahead of the 2007 provincial election. The Charlottetown district covered the entirety of the neighbourhoods of Belvedere and St. Avard's as well as most of Parkdale.

The district had voted reliably Liberal since its inception, sending Doug Currie to the Legislative Assembly in the 2007 election and re-electing him in 2011 and 2015.

Resignation of Doug Currie 
On October 17, 2017, incumbent MLA Doug Currie announced his resignation from the Legislative Assembly effective immediately. In an interview with CBC News, Currie stated "My decision really is about what's in the best for Doug Currie and my two girls — I don't think there's any perfect time to leave public office, but I feel excited about leaving. I feel excited about what I've accomplished." Currie was first elected to the Legislative Assembly in the 2007 election and had served in various ministerial roles under three successive Liberal governments. At the time of his resignation, Currie was Minister of Education, Early Learning and Culture.

Candidates 
Bob Dorion won the Liberal nomination, defeating challenger Marcia Carroll at the party's nomination meeting on October 30. Dorion has been a member of the University of Prince Edward Island Security Police Department since 1987 and has  represented the ward of Mount Edward on the Charlottetown City Council since 2014.

The Progressive Conservatives nominated Melissa Hilton at a meeting on November 1. Hilton has represented the ward of Stonepark on the Charlottetown City Council since 2005.

Hannah Bell won the Green nomination against Karla Bernard by a vote of 72 to 22 at the party's nomination meeting on October 30. Bell was the party's shadow finance critic and was the executive director of the PEI Business Women's Association.

The New Democratic Party nominated their leader Michael Redmond. Redmond had been leader of the NDP PEI since October 2012.

Campaign 
Candidates Hannah Bell and Michael Redmond caused controversy when they campaigned on November 11, Remembrance Day in Canada. While all four candidates attended ceremonies that day, Bob Dorion and Melissa Hilton chose not to campaign. Bell defended her decision to campaign, stating "The reason veterans fought for us was to secure our democracy."

Results

Reactions and aftermath 
In an email statement, Green Party of Canada leader Elizabeth May said the outcome of the by-election showed that "voters are increasingly looking to Greens when it comes to strengthening democracy, fighting for those less fortunate, and leading the way to a sustainable future." Andrew Weaver, leader of the Green Party of British Columbia, released a statement congratulating Hannah Bell and characterizing her victory as a "tidal shift."

Speaking to reporters on election night, Progressive Conservative leader James Aylward stated "Clearly, the MacLauchlan government...has been sent a message. Was it the message that I was necessarily hoping for tonight? Certainly not, but clearly they've been sent a message."

Liberal Premier Wade MacLauchlan did not view the result as significant, saying "I think you really have to look at a by-election as a by-election, with local context and what people have to take into account as they're making their choices. And of course the turnout. That's the nature of by-elections."

Following his fourth-place finish, NDP leader Michael Redmond announced on December 5 that he would meet with the party's executive within the week to determine the future of his leadership. The following day, Redmond announced his resignation as party leader.

References 

2017 elections in Canada
2017 in Prince Edward Island
Provincial by-elections in Prince Edward Island
Politics of Charlottetown